The 100 Greatest Films of the 21st Century is a list compiled in August 2016 by the British Broadcasting Corporation (BBC), chosen by a voting poll of 177 film critics from around the world.

It was compiled by collating the top ten films submitted by the critics who were asked to list the best films released since the year 2000.

Selection criteria

BBC Culture asked 177 film critics from around the world to rank the ten films produced in the twenty-first century that they considered the greatest. Participants were permitted to choose from titles released between January 2000 to June 2016 (when all responses were collected). Each film listed in these responses was then given points based on their ranking. If a film was ranked first in a critic's list, that film would get ten points, whereas the one ranked in tenth place would get one point. The list features 102 titles because of a tie between Carlos, Requiem for a Dream, and Toni Erdmann for the 100th place ranking. With three films apiece, directors Apichatpong Weerasethakul, Christopher Nolan, Wes Anderson, Paul Thomas Anderson, Michael Haneke, and the Coen brothers have the most titles on the list. Spirited Away was the highest ranked animated film at #4, whilst In the Mood for Love was the highest ranked foreign-language film at #2 and Children of Men at #13 was the top film with British production input (the BBC being a British company). Only four films who have won the Academy Award for Best Picture including No Country for Old Men (2007), The Hurt Locker (2009), 12 Years a Slave (2013), and Spotlight (2015).

A total of 177 critics from 36 countries participated in the poll, with the largest number (81) from the United States, followed by the United Kingdom. Out of the 177, 122 are men and fifty-five are women. Most participants are newspaper/magazine film reviewers, Internet film reviewers, academics, and cinema curators.

Full list

References

External links
Official site
Why Mulholland Drive is the greatest film since 2000
Infographic

BBC-related lists
21st-century films
Top film lists
Film criticism
2016 in film
2016 in British cinema